A houri is a woman who will accompany faithful Muslim believers in Paradise.

Houri may also refer to:

People with the given name
Houri Boumedienne, alternative spelling for Houari Boumédiène (1932–1978), Chairman of the Revolutionary Council of Algeria from June 1965 until December 1976 and thereafter the second President of Algeria until his death in 1978

People with the surname 
Adnan Houri (born 1955), Syrian athlete
Cyril Houri (born 1969), French engineer
Hassan Houri (born 1985), Iranian footballer
Lyes Houri (born 1996), French footballer
Samy Houri (born 1985), French footballer

See also
Houry (disambiguation)
Houria
Huri, Iran, a village
Huri Daraq, a village in Iran